Edinburgh Magazine may refer to:

 Blackwood's Edinburgh Magazine, printed from 1817 to 1980
 Edinburgh Magazine and Literary Miscellany, a series published by The Scots Magazine ca. 1825
 Edinburgh Magazine, or Literary Miscellany, printed for J. Sibbald from 1787 to 1802
 Edinburgh Magazine, or, Weekly Amusement, published by Walter Ruddiman in 1779
 Edinburgh Magazine and Review, a monthly periodical published from 1773 to 1776
 Tait's Edinburgh Magazine, a monthly periodical published from 1832 to 1861

See also
 Chambers's Edinburgh Journal, a weekly magazine published from 1832 to 1956
 The List (magazine), an Edinburgh-based fortnightly entertainment event listings magazine first published in 1985
 London and Edinburgh Philosophical Magazine, a scientific journal first published in 1798